Phatso is the second solo studio album by American rapper Jamie Madrox. It was released on May 16, 2006 through Psychopathic Records, making his only solo release on the label (except re-release of his previous effort, Sacrifice, in 2010). Production was handled by Monoxide Child, Bar None Productions and Fritz "The Cat" Vankosky. The album peaked at number 107 on the Billboard 200, number 14 on the Top Rap Albums chart, number three on the Independent Albums chart, and number one on the Heatseekers Albums chart in the United States.

Track listing

Personnel
Jamie "Madrox" Spaniolo – main artist
Paul "Monoxide" Methric – featured artist (tracks: 6, 12), producer (tracks: 2, 6-10, 12), arranger (tracks: 3, 5), mixing (tracks: 1-2, 4, 6-14)
Chris Rouleau – featured artist (track 9), additional vocals (tracks: 10, 11)
Jed Thubman – additional vocals (track 3)
Eddie Cheese aka Matt Nipz – additional vocals (track 7)
Rich aka the Ricker – additional vocals (track 7)
Fritz "The Cat" Van Kosky – producer (tracks: 1, 11), arranger (tracks: 3, 5), mixing (tracks: 1-2, 4, 6-14)
Bar None Productions – producer (tracks: 4, 13, 14)

Charts

References

External links

2006 albums
Jamie Spaniolo albums
Psychopathic Records albums